Oncideres pittieri is a species of beetle in the family Cerambycidae. It was described by Charles Joseph Gahan in 1894. It is known from Costa Rica.

References

pittieri
Beetles described in 1894